Willemsens may refer to:

Abraham Willemsens ( 1605–1610–1672), a Flemish painter 
Lodewijk Willemsens (1630–1702), a Flemish sculptor

See also
Willems
Willemse
Willemsen
Wilhelmsen

Dutch-language surnames
Patronymic surnames